Jaros or Jaroš may refer to:

People
Jaroš Griemiller, 16th-century Czech alchemist
Jaros (surname)
Jaroš (surname)

Other
Japan Resources Observation System Organization (JAROS), a Japanese satellite observation foundation

See also